John Robert Middlemas (born July 4, 1936) is an American politician. He served as a Democratic member for the 8th district of the Florida House of Representatives.

Life and career 
Middlemas was born in Panama City, Florida. He attended Emory University.

In 1966, Middlemas was elected to the Florida House of Representatives. The next year, he was elected as the first representative for the newly-established 8th district. He served until 1970, when he was succeeded by Billy Joe Rish.

References 

1936 births
Living people
People from Panama City, Florida
Democratic Party members of the Florida House of Representatives
20th-century American politicians
Emory University alumni